Liouville's theorem has various meanings, all mathematical results named after Joseph Liouville:

 In complex analysis, see Liouville's theorem (complex analysis)
  There is also a related theorem on harmonic functions
 In conformal mappings, see Liouville's theorem (conformal mappings)
 In Hamiltonian mechanics, see Liouville's theorem (Hamiltonian) and Liouville–Arnold theorem
 In linear differential equations, see Liouville's formula
 In transcendence theory and diophantine approximations, the theorem that any Liouville number is transcendental
 In differential algebra, see Liouville's theorem (differential algebra)
 In differential geometry, see Liouville's equation
  In coarse-grained modelling, see Liouville's equation in coarse graining phase space in classical physics and fine graining of states in quantum physics (von Neumann density matrix)